An alkalide is a chemical compound in which alkali metal atoms are anions (negative ions) with a charge or oxidation state of −1. Until the first discovery of alkalides in the 1970s, alkali metals were known to appear in salts only as cations (positive ions) with a charge or oxidation state of +1. These types of compounds are of theoretical interest due to their unusual stoichiometry and low ionization potentials. Alkalide compounds are chemically related to the electrides, salts in which trapped electrons are effectively the anions.

"Normal" alkali metal compounds
Alkali metals form many well-known stable salts. Sodium chloride (common table salt), illustrates the usual role of an alkali metal such as sodium. In the empirical formula for this ionic compound, the positively charged sodium ion is balanced by a negatively charged chloride ion. The traditional explanation for stable  is that the loss of one electron from elemental sodium to produce a cation with charge of +1 produces a stable closed-shell electron configuration.

Inverse metallic salts would be harder to form due to the high reactivity by the alkalide. By this measure as an example, the inverse salt of sodium chloride, known as chloranium sodide or chloranium natride, would be extremely hard to synthesize not only due to the highly electrophilic nature of chloranium, but also the reductivity of the sodide ion.

Nomenclature and known cases
There are known alkalides for some of the alkali metals:
Sodide or natride, 
Potasside or kalide, 
Rubidide, 
Caeside, 

Alkalides of the other alkali metals have not yet been discovered:
Lithide, 
Francide,

Examples
Normally, alkalides are thermally labile due to the high reactivity of the alkalide anion, which is theoretically able to break most covalent bonds including the carbon–oxygen bonds in a typical cryptand. The introduction of a special cryptand ligand containing amines instead of ether linkages has allowed the isolation of kalides and natrides that are stable at room temperature.

Several alkalides have been synthesized:
A compound in which hydrogen ions are encapsulated by adamanzane, known as hydrogen natride or "inverse sodium hydride" (hydrogen sodide or hydrogen natride ), has been observed.
Sodium-crypt natride, [Na(cryptand[2.2.2])]+Na−, has been observed.
Barium azacryptand-sodide, Ba2+[H5Azacryptand[2.2.2]]−Na−⋅2CH3NH2, has been synthesized.
Dimers of cationic and anionic sodium have been observed.

References

Sodium compounds
Potassium compounds
Rubidium compounds
Caesium compounds
Anions
Alkali metals